David Andrew Vincent Faulkner  (born 10 September 1962) is an English former field hockey player and current head of women's performance at The FA.

He was part of the Great Britain squad that won the gold medal at the 1988 Summer Olympics in Seoul. He also won silver with the England squad at the 1986 Hockey World Cup.

Faulkner was born in Portsmouth, England.  He was the sport's performance director, working with England Hockey and Great Britain Hockey. He has played club hockey for Havant Hockey Club. His sons, Simon and Daniel, have both represented Great Britain and England at junior level and play club hockey in the Men's England Hockey League.

Faulkner joined The FA in April 2017 as head of women's performance having previously held the position of director of sport at Millfield School

He was appointed Member of the Order of the British Empire (MBE) in the 2021 Birthday Honours for services to sport.

References

External links
 
 

1963 births
Living people
Sportspeople from Portsmouth
English male field hockey players
English Olympic medallists
Olympic field hockey players of Great Britain
British male field hockey players
Field hockey players at the 1988 Summer Olympics
Olympic gold medallists for Great Britain
Olympic medalists in field hockey
Medalists at the 1988 Summer Olympics
Havant Hockey Club players
1990 Men's Hockey World Cup players
Members of the Order of the British Empire